Francis in the Navy is a 1955 American black-and-white comedy film from Universal-International, produced by Stanley Rubin and directed by Arthur Lubin. The film stars Donald O'Connor and Martha Hyer, and marked the first credited film role of Clint Eastwood. The distinctive voice of Francis is a voice-over by actor Chill Wills.

This is the sixth film in Universal-International Francis the Talking Mule series.

Plot
U.S. Army officer Lt. Peter Sterling gets mistaken for his lookalike in the U.S. Navy, Bosun's Mate 'Slicker' Donevan, and as a result gets promptly shipped to Donevan's base. With his old pal Francis, Sterling continues his military career misadventures, this time in the Navy.

Cast

Donald O'Connor as Peter Stirling/Bosun's Mate 'Slicker' Donevan
Martha Hyer as Betsy Donevan
Richard Erdman as Murph
Jim Backus as Commander E.T. Hutch
Clint Eastwood as Jonesy
David Janssen as Lieutenant Anders
Leigh Snowden as Nurse Appleby
Martin Milner as W.T. 'Rick' Rickson
Paul Burke as Tate
Myrna Hansen as Helen
Phil Garris as Tony Stover

Production
Donald O'Connor was reluctant to make the film but agreed to do one more at the request of his daughter (in addition to a financial inducement from Universal studio head Edward Muhl).

It was once known as Francis Weighs Anchor and started filming February 15, 1955.

The film was partially shot at the U. S. Navy base in Coronado California, not far from downtown San Diego.

Stanley Rubin was producer on the film.

See also
List of American films of 1955
List of media set in San Diego

References
Citations

Bibliography

External links

Review of film at Variety

1955 films
1950s fantasy comedy films
American black-and-white films
1950s English-language films
Films directed by Arthur Lubin
Films scored by William Lava
Military humor in film
Universal Pictures films
American fantasy comedy films
1955 comedy films
Films about donkeys
1950s American films
Films shot in San Diego
Films set in San Diego
Navy